Moira Kelly (born March 6, 1968) is an American actress. She is known for portraying Kate Moseley in the 1992 film The Cutting Edge as well as single mother Karen Roe on the teen drama One Tree Hill. She is also known for playing the role of Donna Hayward in Twin Peaks: Fire Walk with Me, replacing Lara Flynn Boyle in the prequel to the 1990 TV series Twin Peaks. Other roles include Dorothy Day in Entertaining Angels: The Dorothy Day Story, White House media consultant Mandy Hampton in the first season of The West Wing, and the voice of Simba's love interest Nala in The Lion King and its direct-to-video sequels The Lion King II: Simba's Pride and The Lion King 1½. She also played Hetty Kelly and Oona O'Neill in Chaplin.

Early life
Moira Kelly was born in Queens, New York on March 6, 1968. She is the daughter of Peter (a trained concert violinist) and Anne (a nurse) who are Irish immigrants. Kelly is the third of six children and was raised in Ronkonkoma, New York. She was brought up as a Catholic. Kelly attended Connetquot Senior High School in Bohemia, Long Island, graduating in the class of 1986. Later, she attended Marymount Manhattan College.

In her youth, Kelly was cast in a small role in her high school's 1984 production of Annie. Due to illness, the girl playing Miss Hannigan was replaced, causing a series of cast changes leading to her choice of career. A devout Catholic, Kelly had to decide between acting and her childhood ambition of becoming a nun.

Career
Kelly made her professional acting debut in the fact-based made-for-TV movie Love, Lies and Murder, playing teenager Cinnamon Brown, who was coerced by her father into killing his wife and her stepmother, Linda Brown. She was originally going to have a starring role as Polly Pry in Trey Parker and Matt Stone's Cannibal! The Musical, but Kelly was convinced not to do so by her agent out of concerns it could potentially ruin her career, and was ultimately replaced with Toddy Walters, though she was still credited in the end credits under her initials "M.K." as "the Dropout". She went on to have small roles in the films The Boy Who Cried Bitch, Hi-Life, and Billy Bathgate before being cast as Donna Hayward in Twin Peaks: Fire Walk with Me. For that film, she went home and got permission from her priest because of an explicit sex scene. In the same year, she starred opposite D. B. Sweeney in the romantic comedy The Cutting Edge and played two roles opposite Robert Downey Jr. in Chaplin. According to a TV Guide interview, before taking on her role in Daybreak, Kelly once again asked her priest for advice: "Being a Catholic, I wondered if it would be against my religion to play a girl who has premarital sex." The priest told her "it was okay, as long as my artistic intentions were true and I wasn't doing it for the notoriety or the money."

She has since appeared in the films With Honors, Little Odessa, The Tie That Binds, and Dangerous Beauty, amongst others, and provided the adult voice of Nala in Disney's The Lion King, The Lion King II: Simba's Pride, and The Lion King 1½. In her independent film career, Kelly had the starring role of activist Dorothy Day in Entertaining Angels: The Dorothy Day Story and starred alongside Glenn Close in The Safety of Objects. She played Helen Keller in the made-for-TV movie Monday After the Miracle, which broadcast on November 15, 1998, on CBS.

Kelly starred in the CBS drama To Have & to Hold opposite Jason Beghe before playing Mandy Hampton in the first season of The West Wing. In 2003, Kelly began playing single mother Karen Roe on the teen drama One Tree Hill. She also directed two episodes of the series: "Resolve" (2007) and "I Slept with Someone in Fall Out Boy and All I Got Was This Stupid Song Written About Me" (2006). In the fifth season, she ceased to be a regular cast member, but made guest appearances in the 100th episode and the sixth-season finale. She has made guest appearances in television shows such as Heroes, Law & Order, and Numb3rs. Kelly has also appeared in the films Remember the Daze, A Smile as Big as the Moon, Taken Back: Finding Haley, and Girl in the Bunker.

Personal life
On August 5, 2000, Kelly married Steve Hewitt, a Texas businessman.  They have two children, a daughter Ella and a son Eamon. Kelly previously maintained a residence in Wilmington, North Carolina, for eleven years. They currently reside in Flower Mound, Texas.

Filmography

Film

Television

Video games

As a director

References

External links 
 
 "The Lion Queen": An Interview with Moira Kelly by Aaron Wallace at UltimateDisney.com

Living people
American film actresses
American people of Irish descent
American television actresses
American voice actresses
Marymount Manhattan College alumni
Actresses from New York City
20th-century American actresses
21st-century American actresses
People from Queens, New York
People from Ronkonkoma, New York
Catholics from New York (state)
1968 births